The Chito Branch Reserve is located in southeastern Hillsborough County, Florida, and is part of the Southwest Florida Water Management District landholdings. It is located at 11254 Browning Road in Lithia, Florida. The preserve protects a water resorvoir and offers birdwatching, hiking, biking, and equestrian opportunities.

References

Protected areas of Hillsborough County, Florida
Southwest Florida Water Management District reserves
2001 establishments in Florida
Protected areas established in 2001